Abdulla Mohamed Al-Tamimi (born December 15, 1994, in Doha) is a professional squash player who represents Qatar. He reached a career-high world ranking of World No. 28 in August 2018.

References

External links 
 
 
 

1994 births
Living people
Qatari male squash players
Squash players at the 2010 Asian Games
Squash players at the 2014 Asian Games
Squash players at the 2018 Asian Games
Asian Games competitors for Qatar